Jean-Baptiste Venier was an 18th-century Parisian violinist and music publisher, active from 1750 to 1782.

Biography 

Giovanni Battista Venier, Frenchified as Jean-Baptiste, of Venetian origin, moved to Paris in the 1750s. As a violinist, he performed at the concert spirituel and taught violin until 1782. He obtained a royal privilege for music publishing in 1755 and held until 1782, eventually selling his business to publisher Charles-Georges Boyer in 1784.

First he had no shop but in 1760, his cabinet was located rue Saint-Thomas-du-Louvre, vis-à-vis Château d'Eau. After September 1778, he settled rue Traversière-Saint-Honoré to no loger move.

Venier published many important works, focused exclusively on instrumental music, whether symphonies, concertos and chamber music. He published in particular a series of Sinfonie da varii autori, publishing many authors as we can see from the title pages of these editions. From 1757 or 1758, these symphonies were released by way of periodic, as did his colleagues Huberty and La Chevardière and sometimes in combination, but briefly.

Among the composers, the Italians were Giovanni Battista Sammartini, Gaetano Pugnani, Luigi Boccherini, of whom he gave the Op. 2, and 4 to 9 ; between 1767 and 1772, the Germans, Viennese and the Bohemians were Johann Christian Bach, Haydn (including his Symphony No. 22, Der Philosoph with its adagio published en 1773), and others such as Filtz, Christian Joseph Lidarti, Franz Ignaz Beck, Florian Leopold Gassmann, Wagenseil, Ignaz Fränzl, Dittersdorf  and Carl Joseph Toeschi, Valentin Roeser, Josef Mysliveček and Antonín Kammel… Pieter van Maldere ; Gossec (Symphonies Op. 12) was among the French composers published by Venier.

His publications are commonly available from Castaud (Lyon).

Bibliography 
 Johannson, 1955
 Anik Devriès et François Lesure, Dictionnaire des éditeurs de musique français : Des origines a environ 1820, vol. 1, Genève, Minkoff, coll. "Archives de l'édition musicale française" (n#4, 1), 1979, 203 p. (OCLC 489130205)
 Rudolf Rasch (dir.), Music Publishing in Europe 1600-1900 : Concepts and Issues Bibliography, Berlin, Berliner Wissenschafts-Verlag, coll. "Musical life in Europe 1600-1900, Circulation of music" (#1), 2005, 314 p. (OCLC 60645798, read online
 Michel Hild, Réception de la musique instrumentale allemande en France, Lille, Atelier national de reproduction des thèses, coll. « Thèse à la carte », 2005, 410 p. (OCLC 60452746)

See also 
 Répertoire international des sources musicales

References

External links 
 Some original editions on imslp

Year of birth missing
Year of death missing
Musicians from Venice
18th-century French male classical violinists
French music publishers (people)